Kob-Pokrovka is a rural locality (a selo) in Yazykovsky Selsoviet, Blagovarsky District, Bashkortostan, Russia. The population was 557 as of 2010. There are 2 streets.

Geography 
Kob-Pokrovka is located 4 km north of Yazykovo (the district's administrative centre) by road. Yazykovo is the nearest rural locality.

References 

Rural localities in Blagovarsky District